Brod Moravice is a municipality in the Primorje-Gorski Kotar County in western Croatia. There are 985 inhabitants, with 96% Croats and 4% Italians. It is the smallest municipality, as for population, and oldest one in its county.

History
Brod Moravice was first mentioned in 1260. The rural municipality was founded in the 14th century. Throughout history, it has also been known as Moravice, Gornje Moravice, Turanj and Brodske Moravice. From 1919 until 1991 name was Srpske Moravice.

During the 15th and 16th centuries, the municipality was the subject of numerous Turkish raids.

Geography

Overview
The municipality, part of the historic and geographic large region of the Littoral, is located in the mountain range close to Croatian borders with Slovenia. It dists 65 km from Karlovac, 71 from Rijeka, 114 from Zagreb, 104 from Ljubljana and 144 from Trieste.

Subdivision
The municipality is divided into 38 localities, included the town of Brod Moravice itself. The population, as of 2011, is shown under brackets:

Main sights
The municipality counts lot of ancient church buildings. It is also a receptive place for tourism due to its natural environment.

Transport
Brod Moravice is crossed by the state road D3 and the nearest motorway is the A6 (nearest exit is the n.3 "Ravna Gora"). As for railways, it counts a station on the line Rijeka-Ogulin-Karlovac-Zagreb.

References

External links

 Brod Moravice official website
 Brod Moravice tourist office
Coat of arms of Brod Moravice (hr.wiki)

Populated places in Primorje-Gorski Kotar County
Municipalities of Croatia
Croatia–Slovenia border crossings